Alfred Hollins (11 September 1865 – 17 May 1942) was an English organist, composer and teacher, who was noted as a recitalist in Scotland.

Biography
Hollins was born in Kingston upon Hull, East Riding of Yorkshire, England, and was blind from birth. His mother died while he was young, and little is known about his father. After his mother's death, Hollins was sent to live with his "Aunt Mary", who gave him his first piano lesson. It is rumoured that Hollins had perfect pitch and, upon hearing any two notes on the piano, could name them.

In 1878, Hollins enrolled at the Royal National College for the Blind at Upper Norwood. He impressed the principal of his potential as a musician such that he was given the opportunity to study with Frits Hartvigson on the piano and Dr E. J. Hopkins on the organ. Hollins then presented several successful concerts, including one at The Crystal Palace, where he performed the solo part of the Emperor Concerto, and a concert at Windsor in the presence of Queen Victoria.

The opportunity arose for Hollins to study in Berlin under Hans von Bülow. While in Germany Hollins gave a series of concerts – at one time playing three concerti in the one evening – The Liszt E♭, the Schumann A minor and the Emperor. He played before the royal families of Germany and the Low Countries.

In 1884, Hollins was given his first professional appointment as an organist, at St John's, Redhill. In 1885, Hollins appeared at the Music and Inventions Exhibition in 1885, playing the concert organ. Shortly afterwards another period of study presented itself at the Hoch Conservatory in Frankfurt.

In the ensuing eleven years, Hollins was organist at Upper Norwood Presbyterian Church, at the People's Palace (Crystal Palace) and teaching piano and organ at the Royal National College for the Blind. During this period Hollins also made a tour of the United States, and visited major concert halls at the time.

Soon the Reverend Hugh Black, assistant minister at the Free St George's Church in Edinburgh persuaded the Presbyterian kirk to allow the installation of an organ at St George's. An organ was procured. According to some stories, Black travelled to Nottingham to hear Hollins play, and offered Hollins the position there and then. Hollins accepted the offer and was then committed to St George's for the rest of his life.

Hollins did make multiple concert tours. In 1904, Hollins toured New Zealand and Australia. In 1907, 1909 and 1916 he went to South Africa to give a series of concerts at Johannesburg, Port Elizabeth, and Cape Town, giving the opening recital for the organ at the new Town Hall in Cape Town. He had been instrumental in developing the specification for the organ. On 2 and 9 August 1907 he played on the Feather Market Hall organ, Port Elizabeth, which at that time was the largest organ in South Africa. In 1913 he played in Germany, recording for the Welte Philharmonic Organ.

In 1922, Hollins was awarded an honorary doctorate of music from the University of Edinburgh. This was in addition to being made an Honorary Fellow of the Royal College of Organists in 1904.

In 1923, Hollins played at the inaugural recital of the Caird Hall Organ, Dundee, Scotland, which he had designed. This famous concert organ was the first built by Harrison & Harrison, Durham, England, and has been maintained by them since. It is a Grade 1 Historic Organ (BIOS) and is recognized as one of the finest instruments of its kind in the UK and further afield.

In 1925–26 Hollins gave a major tour of the United States, during which he visited 65 cities. It has been estimated that Hollins traveled some 600,000 miles on his concert tours.

In later years, Hollins wrote A Blind Musician Looks Back, his memories as an organist and teacher.

He died in Edinburgh in 1942, aged 76.

References

Hollins, Dundee, 1923:  Dundee city Archives; Friends of the Caird Hall Organ (FOCHO) SC041021 Archives
Alfred Hollins: A Blind Musician Looks Back: An Autobiography. London 1936. Reprint: Bardon Enterprises; New edition,

External links
 MusicWeb Biography, list of works, etc.

Free scores
 

1865 births
1942 deaths
British male organists
British music educators
English classical composers
English classical organists
Alumni of the Royal National College for the Blind
Blind classical musicians
Hoch Conservatory alumni
Musicians from Kingston upon Hull
Male classical organists